Leif Fredriksson a Swedish drummer and a member of the Swedish group TRIO.

Biography

Discography

TRIO
 From Nowhere to Eternity 2008, TRIO01

therhythmisodd
 Subway  2010, TRIO02
 Raw Material 2011, TRIO03
 Fly By Time, 2014,
 Fly by Time (extravaganza), 2018

Other

Anders Karlen
 Way out 1981, MLR-20 (mistlur)

Dag Mattsson
 Don't force the level 1997

Egba
 Elektrobop 1985, DRLP80 (Dragon)
 Fuse       1983, MNW126P (MNW)
 Omen       1981, MNW115P (MNW)

Greg FitzPatrick
 Det Persiska Äventyret 1977, MNW 80P (MNW)

Monica Törnell
 Bush Lady  1977,

Monica Zetterlund
 Monica Z 1989,

Lulu Alke
 Lulu Alke 1994

Ulf Adåker / Swedish Radio Jazz Group
  Chordeography  1986. PS36  (Phono Suecia)

Gustavo Bergalli Quintet
  S/T  	1986, DRLP 119 (DRAGON)

References

http://www.proggnosis.com/PGArtist.asp?AID=9236 Information about Leif and TRIO from www.Proggnosis.com

External links
 Trio Homepage The official TRIO (The.Rhythm.Is.Odd) site.
 www.progg.se a Swedish prog site with info about bands like Egba
 

Swedish drummers
Male drummers
Living people
Year of birth missing (living people)